Mej Didi is a 1950 Bengali film directed by Sabyasachi and produced by Kanan Devi. The film's music was composed by Kalipada Sen. The film was remade in Hindi as Majhli Didi.

Cast
 Jahar Ganguly
 Nripati Chattopadhyay
 Tulsi Chakraborty
 Kanan Devi
 Shobha Sen
 Ashu Bose
 Kumar Mitra
 Asha Devi
 Sikharani Bag

References

External links
 
 Mej Didi (1950 film) in Gomolo

1950 films
Bengali-language Indian films
Bengali films remade in other languages
1950s Bengali-language films
Indian drama films
1950 drama films
Indian black-and-white films